Ronald Donald Southern,  (July 25, 1930 – January 21, 2016) was a Canadian businessman. He was the founder and chairman of Calgary-based ATCO Group, and the founder of the Spruce Meadows equestrian centre.

In 1947, Southern and his father each invested $2,000 in the original Alberta Trailer Hire Co., which later became ATCO.  Southern received a Bachelor of Science degree from the University of Alberta in 1953 and began to work full-time for the company. As of 2007 the Southern family is still in control of ATCO. He passed the title of chairman, president and chief executive officer to his daughter, Nancy Southern, in January 2000.

Spruce Meadows
Southern and his wife Margaret Southern were the founders and co-chairs of Spruce Meadows. Opened in 1975, it was built for their daughters who had long been involved with competitive equestrian riding.

Other affiliations
Southern served as a director of several corporations, including Lafarge, Southam Inc., Chrysler Corporation of Canada, Imasco, Canadian Airlines, Fletcher Challenge, Royal & SunAlliance and Canadian Pacific. He was a director of Akita Drilling Ltd. and chairman of Sentgraf Enterprises Ltd.  Southern was also a member of the Trilateral Commission. In September 2006, Ron Southern was appointed Officer of Orange Nassau by Her Majesty Queen Beatrix of The Netherlands.

Honours and awards
Southern received Canada's highest civilian honor when he was invested as a Member of the Order of Canada in 1986. He was invested as a Companion of the Order of the British Empire in 1990, in recognition for his promotion of Anglo-Canadian relations in the fields of commerce, culture and sport. In 1992 he received the 125th Anniversary of the Confederation of Canada Medal. In 2002 he received the Canadian version of the Queen Elizabeth II Golden Jubilee Medal. In June 1995, he was elevated as a Commander of the Order of the British Empire (CBE). In August 2003, Southern was elevated as an Officer of the Order of Canada and was promoted to Companion in 2006. In September 2006 he was invested as an Officer of the Order of Orange-Nassau by the Kingdom of the Netherlands. In 2012, Southern was appointed to the Alberta Order of Excellence. In 2012, Southern and wife Margaret were awarded the Canadian version of the Queen Elizabeth II Diamond Jubilee Medal by the Lieutenant Governor of Alberta, Donald Ethell.

He received honorary doctoral degrees from the University of Calgary in 1976 and the University of Alberta in 1991. In 1990, Southern received the International Distinguished Entrepreneur Award, presented by the University of Manitoba through the Faculty of Management and in 1995 Southern was inducted into the Canadian Business Hall of Fame. In 1996, Southern was named Financial Post CEO of the Year. He and his wife were inducted into Canada's Sports Hall of Fame in 2006.

References

External links
 ATCO official site
 1996 CEO of the Year

1930 births
2016 deaths
Businesspeople from Calgary
Companions of the Order of Canada
Canadian Commanders of the Order of the British Empire
ATCO
Members of the Alberta Order of Excellence
Officers of the Order of Orange-Nassau